Chaa Jaa Re is an upcoming romantic film. The film features Aditi Singh, Jawed Sheikh, Nadeem Baig, Asad Jameel,  Arisha Razi, Aslam Sheikh, Mehboob Sultan, and Madeeha Zaidi. It is directed by Jibran Bashir.

Cast
 Aditi Singh
 Jawed Sheikh as Jani Baloch
 Nadeem Baig as Sir Nadeem

Special appearances
 Meera
 Mathira
 Sana Fakhar
 Laila Khan
 Shameen Khan
 Shehroz Sabzwari
 Agha Ali
 Aijaz Aslam
 Behroze Sabzwari
 Mehmood Aslam
 Hina Dilpazeer
 Jan Rambo
 Sahiba Afzal

See also
 Cinema of Pakistan
 Lollywood
 List of highest-grossing Pakistani films

References

External links 
 
 

Pakistani romance films
2020s Urdu-language films
Lollywood films
Unreleased Pakistani films
Urdu-language Pakistani films